The 2017 Pac–12 Conference football season is the seventh for the twelve-team league. The season began on August 26, 2017, and ended with the Pac-12 Championship Game on December 1, 2017 at Levi's Stadium.

Previous season
Washington defeated Colorado 41–10 for the 2016 Pac-12 Football Championship Game.

Six teams participated in bowl games. Stanford defeated North Carolina 25–23 in the Sun Bowl. Utah won over Indiana 26–24 at the Foster Farms Bowl. Washington State lost 12–17 to Minnesota in the Holiday Bowl. Colorado lost to Oklahoma State 8–38 in the Alamo Bowl. In the Rose Bowl, USC defeated Penn State 52–49. And in the College Football Playoff Semifinal Round, Washington lost to Alabama by a score of 7–24.

Pre-season
2017 Pac-12 Spring Football and number of signees on signing day:

North Division
California – 14 signees
Oregon – 24 signees
Oregon State – 24 signees
Stanford – 14 signees
Washington – 18 signees
Washington State – 27 signees 	

South Division  
Arizona – 34 signees
Arizona State – 19 signees
Colorado – 28 signees
UCLA – 18 signees
USC – 26 signees
Utah – 21 signees

Pac-12 media days
The Pac-12 conducted its annual media days at the Loews Hollywood Hotel, – The Loews Hollywood Hotel in Hollywood, CA between July 26 and July 27. The event commenced with a speech by Pac-12 commissioner Larry Scott, and all 12 teams sent their head coaches and two selected players to speak with members of the media. The event along with all speakers and interviews were broadcast live on the Pac-12 Network. The teams and representatives in respective order were as follows:

Wednesday 
 Pac-12 Commissioner – Larry Scott	
 Washington – Chris Petersen (HC), Jake Browning (QB) & Keishawn Bierria (LB)
 Arizona – Rich Rodriguez (HC), Jacob Alsadek (OL) & Luca Bruno, (DL)
 California – Justin Wilcox (HC), Tre Watson (RB) & James Looney (DT)
 UCLA – Jim Mora (HC), Scott Quessenberry (OT) & Kenny Young (LB)
 Oregon State – Gary Andersen (HC), Ryan Nall (RB) & Manase Hungalu (LB)	
 Colorado – Mike MacIntyre (HC), Phillip Lindsay (RB) & Derek McCartney (LB)

Thursday  
 Pac-12 VP of Officiating – David Coleman	 
 Utah – Kyle Whittingham (HC), Salesi Uhatafe (RG) & Filipo Mokofisi (DT)
 Oregon – Willie Taggart (HC), Justin Herbert (QB) & Troy Dye (LB)
 Arizona State – Todd Graham (HC), Kalen Ballage (RB) & JoJo Wicker (DL)	
 Stanford – David Shaw (HC),  Bryce Love (RB) & Harrison Phillips (DT)
 Washington State – Mike Leach (HC), Jamal Morrow (RB) & Peyton Pelluer (LB)
 USC – Clay Helton (HC), Sam Darnold (QB) & Cameron Smith (LB)

Preseason Media Polls
The Pac-12 Media Days concluded with its annual preseason media polls. Since 1992, the credentialed media has gotten the preseason champion correct just five times. Only eight times has the preseason pick even made it to the Pac-12 title game. Below are the results of the media poll with total points received next to each school and first-place votes in parentheses.

Pac-12 Champion Voting
 USC – 28
 Washington – 22
 Oregon – 1
 Utah – 1

 
North Division
 1. Washington Huskies (309 pts., 49 votes)
 2. Stanford Cardinal (247 pts., 1 vote) 
 3. Washington State Cougars (206 pts., 1 vote)
 4. Oregon Ducks (163 pts., 1 vote) 
 5. Oregon State Beavers (101 pts.)
 6. California Golden Bears (64 pts.)

South Division
 1. USC Trojans (309 pts., 49 votes)
 2. Utah Utes (220 pts., 1 vote)
 3. UCLA Bruins (209 pts., 1 vote) 
 4. Colorado Buffaloes (182 pts., 1 vote)
 5. Arizona State Sun Devils (109 pts) 
 6. Arizona Wildcats (61 pts.)

References:

Recruiting classes

Head coaches

Coaching changes
There were two coaching changes following the 2017 season including Justin Wilcox with California and Willie Taggart with Oregon.

Coaches

Rankings

Schedule

All times Pacific time.  Pac-12 teams in bold.

Rankings reflect those of the AP poll for that week.

Regular season

Week 1

Week 2

Week 3

Week 4

Week 5

Week 6

Week 7

Week 8

Week 9

Week 10

Week 11

Week 12

Week 13

Championship game

The championship game will played on December 1, 2017. It will feature the teams with the best conference records from each division, Stanford from the North and USC from the South. This will be the seventh championship game and is also a rematch of the 2015 Pac-12 Football Championship Game, the first rematch in the history of the Pac-12 Football Championship Game.

Week 14 (Pac-12 Championship Game)

Pac-12 vs other conferences

Pac-12 vs Power Five matchups
This is a list of the power conference teams (ACC, Big 10, Big 12, Notre Dame and SEC), Although not all consider BYU a "Power Five" school, the Pac-12 considers games against BYU as satisfying its "Power Five" scheduling requirement. The Pac-12 plays in the non-conference games. All rankings are from the current AP Poll at the time of the game.

Records against other conferences
2017 records against non-conference foes as of (Nov 25, 2017):

Regular Season

Post Season

Postseason

Bowl games

Rankings are from AP Poll.  All times Pacific Time Zone.

* Rankings based on CFP rankings, Pac-12 team is bolded

Selection of teams: Arizona, Arizona State, Oregon, Stanford, UCLA, USC, Utah, Washington, Washington State (9)

Awards and honors

Player of the week honors

Following each week's games, Pac-12 conference officials select the players of the week from the conference's teams.

All-Conference teams
The following players earned All-Pac-12 honors.

First Team

Second Team

Honorable mentions
ARIZONA: OL Jacob Alsadek, RSr.; RS Shun Brown, Jr.; OL Nate Eldridge, So.; LB Colin Schooler, Fr.; QB Khalil Tate, So.; RB Nick Wilson, Sr.
ARIZONA STATE:  DB Chad Adams, Sr..; LB DJ Calhoun, Sr.; OL Sam Jones, RJr.; RB Demario Richard, Sr.; LB Christian Sam, Jr.; DL Tashon Smallwood, Sr.; QB Manny Wilkins, Jr.
CALIFORNIA: LB Devante Downs, Sr.; RB Patrick Laird, Jr.; DL James Looney, Sr.; OL Patrick Mekari, Jr.
COLORADO: LB Rick Gamboa, Jr.; OL Jeromy Irwin, Sr.; RB Phillip Lindsay, Sr.; QB Steven Montez, So.; DB Evan Worthington, Jr.
OREGON: DB Ugo Amadi, Jr.; TE Jake Breeland, RSo.; OL Jake Hanson, RSo.; DB Arrion Springs, Sr.; OL Calvin Throckmorton, So.
OREGON STATE: LB Manase Hungalu, RSr.; DB David Morris, Fr.
STANFORD: OL Jesse Burkett, Sr.; OL A.T. Hall, Sr.; OL Walker Little, Fr.; LB Bobby Okereke, Sr.; RS Cameron Scarlett, Jr.; AP/ST Brandon Simmons, Sr.; PK Jet Toner, So.; WR J. J. Arcega-Whiteside, Jr.
UCLA: WR Darren Andrews, RSr.; WR Jordan Lasley, RJr.; OL Scott Quessenberry, RSr.; OL Najee Toran, Sr.; DL Jacob Tuioti-Mariner, Sr.
USC: OL Chris Brown, RJr.; TB Stephen Carr, Fr.; DL Josh Fatu, Sr.; DB Chris Hawkins, RSr.; DB Iman Marshall, Jr.; WR Steven Mitchell Jr., RSr.; TE Tyler Petite, Jr.; DL Brandon Pili, Fr.; TB Tyler Vaughns, RFr.
UTAH: OL Lo Falemaka, Sr.; LB Kavika Luafatasaga, Sr.; DL Lowell Lotulelei, Sr.; DL Filipo Mokofisi, Sr.
WASHINGTON: TB Salvon Ahmed, Fr.; LB Tevis Bartlett, Jr.; QB Jake Browning, Jr.; DB Myles Bryant, So.; OL Nick Harris, So.
WASHINGTON STATE: OL Andre Dillard, RJr.; QB Luke Falk, RSr.; LB Frankie Luvu, Sr.; RB Jamal Morrow, RSr.

Pac-12 individual awards
The following individuals won the Pac-12 conference's annual player and coach awards:

Pac-12 Offensive Player of the Year
Bryce Love, Stanford

Pac-12 Defensive Player of the Year
Vita Vea, Washington

Pac-12 Coach of the Year
David Shaw, Stanford

Pac-12 Offensive Freshman Player of the Year
J. J. Taylor, Arizona and Walker Little, Stanford

Pac-12 Defensive Freshman Player of the Year
Colin Schooler, Arizona

Pac-12 Scholar Athlete Player of the Year
Matt Anderson, California

All-Americans
The following Pac-12 players were named to the 2017 College Football All-America Team by the Walter Camp Football Foundation (WCFF), Associated Press (AP), Football Writers Association of america (FWAA), Sporting News (SN), and American Football Coaches Association (AFCA):

Academic All-America Team Member of the Year (CoSIDA):

All-Academic

First team

Second team

Honorable mentions: ARIZ: Leon Branden, Jamie Nunley, Josh Pollack, Khalil Tate; ASU: Mitchell Fraboni, Tommy Hudson, Connor Humphreys, Malik Lawal, Alex Losoya, A.J. McCollum, Michael Sleep-Dalton, Tashon Smallwood, Kyle Williams; CAL: Jordan Kunaszyk, Demetris Robertson, Gabe Siemieniec, Russ Ude; COLO: Lucas Cooper, George Frazier, Aaron Haigler, Michael Mathewes; ORE: Taylor Alie, Kaulana Apelu, Gary Baker, Brady Breeze, Jacob Breeland, Doug Brenner, Jacob Capra, Drayton Carlberg, Jake Hanson, Shane Lemieux, Malik Lovette, Cam McCormick; OSU: Blake Brandel, Jordan Choukair, Summer Houston, Andrzejh Hughes-Murray, Nous Keobounnam, Trent Moore, Artavis Pierce, Nick Porebski, Tuli Wily-Matagi; STAN: Joey Alfieri, Malik Antoine, Jake Bailey, Isaiah Brandt-Sims, David Bright, Keller Chryst, K. J. Costello, Obi Eboh, Ben Edwards, Scooter Harrington, Nate Herbig, Trenton Irwin, Peter Kalambayi, Quenton Meeks, Alameen Murphy, Kevin Palma, Kaden Smith, Donald Stewart, Jet Toner, Jay Tyler, Mike Tyler; UCLA: Michael Alves, Johnny Den Bleyker, Giovanni Gentosi, Theo Howard, Nate Meadors, Marcus Moore, Christian Pabico, Josh Rosen, Jordan Wilson, Alex Whittingham, Kenny Young; USC: Jordan Austin, Wyatt Schmidt; UTAH: Julian Blackmon, Devonta’e Henry-Cole, Hayes Hicken, Casey Hughes, Tyler Huntley, Jake Jackson, Troy Williams; WASH: A.J. Carty, Sean Constantine, Will Dissly, Coleman Shelton, Nick Harris, Drew Sample, Vita Vea, Tristan Vizcaino; WSU: Nick Begg, Tristan Brock, Kyle Celli, Taylor Comfort, Isaac Dotson, Luke Falk, Dezmon Patmon, Trey Tinsley.

National award winners

Bryce Love
 Doak Walker Award

Home game attendance

Bold – Exceed capacity
†Season High

Attendance for neutral site games:
August 27 - Stanford vs. Rice, 33,101
September 1 – Colorado vs. Colorado State, 73,932

References